Vanessa Rosalia Marquez (December 21, 1968 – August 30, 2018) was an American actress. She was primarily known for her recurring role in the first three seasons of ER as nurse Wendy Goldman, as well as her role as Ana Delgado in the 1988 biographical drama film, Stand and Deliver.

Career 
Marquez appeared in a 1992 episode of Seinfeld called "The Cheever Letters", portraying a secretary in the Cuban Permanent Mission (the US and Cuba did not have mutual embassies from 1961 to 2015). Her success with Stand and Deliver led to a career in film and television, with roles in the crime drama, Blood In Blood Out (1993), and the independent film, Twenty Bucks (1993). Her television work included guest spots on popular programs, including Melrose Place in 1994 and Malcolm & Eddie in 1999, and recurring roles on ER from 1994 to 1997. In addition to her acting credentials, Marquez appeared as a singer in the 2000 thriller film, Under Suspicion.

Personal life 
Vanessa Rosalia Marquez was born in Los Angeles County, California. She was the daughter of John Marquez, who died during the Vietnam War when she was one and half years old; and Delia. She grew up in Montebello, where she attended Schurr High School.

Prior to her death, Marquez made headlines related to the #MeToo movement, alleging that she endured harassment while on the set of ER. In October 2017, she accused series star George Clooney of helping to "blacklist" her after she complained to executives about the harassment. Clooney denied the allegations.

Mental illness and health problems 
Marquez appeared in an early episode of the A&E Network reality television series Intervention, as she tried to manage her shopping addiction. Marquez was given an "intervention" by friends (including Stand and Deliver co-star, Karla Montana) to get her to go to treatment (she later said that her treatment was not successful). She had serious mental health issues, including bipolar disorder, obsessive-compulsive disorder, and agoraphobia, that ended her career as an actress and left her almost entirely homebound. She also had celiac disease, fibromyalgia, and depression at the time of her death, and had regular seizures.

Death 

Marquez's death occurred during an incident on August 30, 2018, at her home in South Pasadena, California, where a wellness check by local authorities led to an armed confrontation. Her home was found in a state of disarray and she claimed to be experiencing a seizure, for which paramedics and a mental health expert were called to evaluate her. Marquez was shot several times by police after she pointed a firearm and advanced toward the officers, who had retreated down the stairs after initially seeing the firearm. She was taken to a nearby hospital where she was pronounced dead at 2:36 p.m. local time. The firearm was later determined to be a BB gun. The Los Angeles County District Attorney's Office has ruled that the police officers had acted in lawful self-defense in the shooting.

In February 2019, attorneys representing her mother filed a wrongful death claim against the City of South Pasadena. The claim alleges battery, negligence, unlawful entry, false arrest and imprisonment, wrongful death, negligent training, conspiracy, seizure of property, failure to summon prompt medical care and violation of the Bane Act.

In March 2020, the South Pasadena Police Department released bodycam footage from the incident, showing Marquez pleading to the officers to kill her, as well as pointing the BB gun at them. The LA County District Attorney's Office released its report on February 25 the same year.

On February 23, 2021, the City of South Pasadena settled the wrongful death suit with Marquez's mother in the amount of $450,000.

Filmography

Film

Television

Video

References

External links 
 
 
 Police bodycam footage of shooting

1968 births
2018 deaths
20th-century American actresses
21st-century American actresses
Actresses from Los Angeles County, California
American actresses of Mexican descent
American film actresses
American stage actresses
American television actresses
Deaths by firearm in California
Defensive gun use
Filmed deaths of entertainers
Filmed killings by law enforcement
Hoarders
Latino people shot dead by law enforcement officers in the United States
People from Montebello, California
People from South Pasadena, California
People with autoimmune disease
People with bipolar disorder
People with epilepsy
People with obsessive–compulsive disorder